In Greek mythology, Cameirus (Ancient Greek: Κάμειρον) was the eponymous founder of Camirus in Rhodes. He was the son of the Rhodian king, Cercaphus, one of the Heliades, and his niece Cydippe, daughter of Ochimus, also a former king. He had two brothers, Lindus and Ialysus who was the eldest. In some accounts, Cameirus' parents were given as Rhode and Poseidon.

Mythology 
Cameirus and his brothers succeeded to the throne after their father's death. During their time, the great deluge came in which their mother, who was now named as Cyrbê, was buried beneath the flood and laid waste. Later on, they parted the land among themselves, and each of them founded a city which bore his name.

See also 

 Telchines

Notes

References 

 Diodorus Siculus, The Library of History translated by Charles Henry Oldfather. Twelve volumes. Loeb Classical Library. Cambridge, Massachusetts: Harvard University Press; London: William Heinemann, Ltd. 1989. Vol. 3. Books 4.59–8. Online version at Bill Thayer's Web Site
 Diodorus Siculus, Bibliotheca Historica. Vol 1-2. Immanel Bekker. Ludwig Dindorf. Friedrich Vogel. in aedibus B. G. Teubneri. Leipzig. 1888–1890. Greek text available at the Perseus Digital Library.
 Pindar, Odes translated by Diane Arnson Svarlien. 1990. Online version at the Perseus Digital Library.
 Pindar, The Odes of Pindar including the Principal Fragments with an Introduction and an English Translation by Sir John Sandys, Litt.D., FBA. Cambridge, MA., Harvard University Press; London, William Heinemann Ltd. 1937. Greek text available at the Perseus Digital Library.
Strabo, The Geography of Strabo. Edition by H.L. Jones. Cambridge, Mass.: Harvard University Press; London: William Heinemann, Ltd. 1924. Online version at the Perseus Digital Library.
Strabo, Geographica edited by A. Meineke. Leipzig: Teubner. 1877. Greek text available at the Perseus Digital Library.

Children of Poseidon
Demigods in classical mythology
Rhodian characters in Greek mythology